Daniel David Jebbison (born 13 August 2003) is a professional footballer who plays as a forward for  club Sheffield United. Born in Canada, Jebbison has represented England at the youth international level.

Career 
Jebbison was born in Oakville, Ontario and began playing football at the ANB Futbol youth academy. He lived in Canada until he was 13, in 2017 he relocated to England with his family and they settled in Derby, with Jebbison attending Derby Moor Academy in the Littleover region of Derby. Jebbison joined the Sheffield United Academy in 2018 after a successful trial. After passing through Sheffield United's U18 and U23 development sides, he joined Chorley on a short-term loan on 24 December 2020, having played for them twice. Soon after returning to Sheffield United, he made his professional debut with them in a 2–0 Premier League loss to Crystal Palace on 8 May 2021. Jebbison scored his first goal for the club against Everton on 16 May, becoming the youngest player to score in their first start in the Premier League. On 21 May, he signed his first professional contract.

On 31 August 2021, Jebbison joined League One Burton Albion on loan. On 11 September he made his debut for his loan club, coming off the bench in a 1–1 draw against Gillingham. A couple weeks later on 28 September, Jebbison scored his first goal for Burton in a 2–1 home win against Portsmouth in league action. Jebbison was recalled by Sheffield United on 31 January 2022.

International career
Jebbison was born in Canada to a Jamaican father and English mother, and moved to England in 2017. He is eligible to play for all three senior teams. He debuted with the England under-18s in a friendly 2–0 win over the Wales under-18s on 29 March 2021. On 18 June, Jebbison was named to Canada's 60-man provisional squad for the 2021 CONCACAF Gold Cup.

On 2 September 2021, Jebbison made his debut for the England U19s during a 2-0 victory over Italy at St. George's Park. He scored his first goal for the under-19s during a 1–1 draw with Germany in Bad Dürrheim on 6 September.

On 17 June 2022, Jebbison was included in the England U19 squad for the 2022 UEFA European Under-19 Championship. He scored against Serbia during the group stage. England won the tournament with a 3-1 extra time victory over Israel on 1 July 2022.

On 24 September 2022, Jebbison made his England U20 debut as a substitute during a 2-1 victory over Morocco at the Pinatar Arena.

Career statistics

Honours
England U19s

 UEFA European Under-19 Championship: 2022

References

External links
 

2003 births
Living people
Soccer people from Ontario
Sportspeople from Oakville, Ontario
English footballers
England youth international footballers
Canadian soccer players
English people of Jamaican descent
Canadian people of English descent
Canadian people of Jamaican descent
Association football forwards
ANB Futbol players
Sheffield United F.C. players
Chorley F.C. players
Burton Albion F.C. players
Premier League players
National League (English football) players
English Football League players
Black British sportspeople